Carnival de Cuba is one of the largest free festivals celebrating Cuban Culture in the United Kingdom and Europe, and has been held in London's Southwark Park and Burgess Park. It has included live salsa bands, dance, food, drink, and kids' events. The event is normally held around June. The event regularly has attendances in excess of 50,000 people and attracts top Salsa bands, and Cuban reggaeton stars including Papo Record, Kid Afrika, and Osvaldo Chacon y su Timba. The Carnaval moved to Burgess Park in 2009, and appeared at Glastonbury in 2010.

See also
  Cubans in the United Kingdom

References

Annual events in London
Cuban diaspora
Festivals in London
Latin American carnivals in the United Kingdom
Parades in London